Darinka Mirković Borović (18 January 1896 – 8 February 1979) was a Montenegrin nurse during World War I and a bearer of the Albanian Commemorative Medal.

Biography
Darinka Mirković Borović was born in Pljevlja on 18 January 1896. There, she met a young lieutenant of the Serbian army, Stanislav Staš Milovanović, from Belgrade. After marriage in the summer of 1914, they moved to Belgrade. After receiving medical training, she helped the wounded in the Valjevo Hospital and on the battlefields. She survived the crossing to Albania and in 1917, she reached Marseille, where wounded and sick Serbian soldiers were evacuated. In Marseille, she met Petar Borovic, born in Šibenik, who worked in the Allied medical treatment. They married in 1920 in Belgrade, where they continued to live. Borović was active in humanitarian societies and the Circle of Serbian Sisters, She was a great friend of Queen Maria of Yugoslavia. Borović helped organize many charity events to raise funds for hospitals, schools, and orphanages. She died on 8 February 1979 in Belgrade and is buried in the Belgrade New Cemetery.

References

1896 births
1979 deaths
People from Pljevlja
Montenegrin women in World War I
Circle of Serbian Sisters
Female nurses in World War I
World War I nurses
Montenegrin nurses